Josele Garza (born March 15, 1962 in Mexico City, Mexico) is a Mexican professional race car driver. He started seven Indianapolis 500 races. Garza was the 1981 Indianapolis 500 Rookie of the Year after starting sixth, leading 13 laps, and finishing 23rd at the age of 19. At 19 years, two months, and nine days, Garza is the second youngest driver to compete in the Indianapolis 500 and was not surpassed until 2003 by A. J. Foyt IV. USAC rules at the time required drivers to be 21 years of age, but Garza's racing license listed him as being 22 years old. Garza claims he does not know how the error occurred, but he did not notify officials of the error. He finished 10th in the 1984 Indianapolis 500.

Garza was winless in 88 CART races. His best career finish was a second place at the 1986 Michigan 500. In 1986, he tested a Brabham Formula One car, during free practice of the 1986 Mexican Grand Prix. After he finished his career in CART, he tested with Minardi in F1 during 1987-88 but never got the required sponsorship to be awarded a race seat and he never made his debut in F1. He came back to Mexico and later he became a team owner in Mexican F2 and F3000 and sometimes raced when his drivers were not up to standard, or absent for some reason.

Racing record

Complete USAC Mini-Indy Series results

Complete Formula One World Championship results
(key) (Races in bold indicate pole position / Races in italics indicate fastest lap)

CART

(key) (Races in bold indicate pole position)

Indianapolis 500 results

References

1962 births
Living people
Mexican racing drivers
Indianapolis 500 drivers
Indianapolis 500 Rookies of the Year
Champ Car drivers
Atlantic Championship drivers
SCCA Formula Super Vee drivers
Racing drivers from Mexico City
Mexican Indianapolis 500 drivers